The first season of Deutschland sucht den Superstar premiered on 24 November 2002 and continued until 8 March 2003. It was won by Alexander Klaws. The season was co-hosted by Michelle Hunziker and Carsten Spengemann.

Finals

Finalists
(Ages stated at time of contest)

Live show details

Heat 1 (30 November 2002)

Notes
Alexander Klaws, Judith Lefeber and Daniel Küblböck advanced to the top 10 of the competition. The other seven contestants were eliminated.
Vanessa Struhler returned for a second chance at the top 10 in the "Wildcard Round" and won and completed the top 10.

Heat 2 (7 December 2002)

Notes
Juliette Schoppmann, Gracia Baur and Nektarios Bamiatzis advanced to the top 10 of the competition. The other seven contestants were eliminated.
Nicole Süßmilch returned for a second chance at the top 10 in the "Wildcard Round" and lost.

Heat 3 (14 December 2002)

Notes
Daniel Lopes, Andrea Josten and Stephanie Brauckmeyer advanced to the top 10 of the competition. The other seven contestants were eliminated.
Tarik Sarzep returned for a second chance at the top 10 in the "Wildcard Round" and lost.

Live show 1 (21 December 2002)
Theme: My Superstar

Live show 2 (28 December 2002)
Theme: Love songs

Live show 3 (4 January 2003)
Theme: Hits of 2002

Live show 4 (11 January 2003)
Theme: Musicals

Live show 5 (18 January 2003)
Theme: The 80s

Live show 6 (1 February 2003)
Theme: Big Band

Live show 7 (8 February 2003)
Theme: The 70s & Disco

Live show 8: semi-final (1 March 2003)
Theme: Movies

Live final (8 March 2003)

Releases
DSDS finalists
 Albums: United (2002)
 Singles: "We Have a Dream", "Tonight" (Promotional)

Alexander Klaws
 Albums: Take Your Chance (2003), Here I Am (2004), Attention! (2006) Was Willst Du Noch? (2008)
 Singles: "Take Me Tonight", "Stay with Me", "Free like the Wind", "Behind the Sun", "Sunshine After the Rain", "Here I Am", "All (I Ever Want)", "Not like You", "Welt"

Juliette Schoppmann
 Albums: Unique (2003)
 Singles: "Calling You", "It's Only Uh Uh", "I Still Believe"

Daniel Küblböck
 Albums: Positive Energie (2003), Liebe Nation (2005)
 Singles: "You Drive Me Crazy", "Heartbeat", "The Lion Sleeps Tonight", "Teenage Tears", "König von Deutschland"

Vanessa Struhler
 Albums: Ride with Me (2003), Independence (2004)
 Singles: "Ride or Die (I Need You)", "Fiesta", "Ey Ey Ey/Back to Life", "One Single Tear", "Blah Blah Blah", "Don't Say (You're Sorry)", "Bonafide", "Take Me Slow", "When U Luv"

Gracia Baur
 Albums: Intoxicated (2003), Passion (2005)
 Singles: "I Don't Think So", "I Believe in Miracles", "Run & Hide", "When the Last Tear's Been Dried", "Never Been"

Nicole Süßmilch
 Singles: "A Miracle of Love" (with Marco Matias)

Daniel Lopes
 Albums: For You (2003)
 Singles: "Shine on", "I Love You More Than Yesterday", "Last Christmas/I Used To Cry", "Change the World"

Nektarios Bamiatzis
 Singles: "Looks like We Made It"

Judith Lefeber
 Alben: In My Dreams (2003), In My Room (2004)
 Singles: "I Will Follow You", "Everybody Does", "In My Room"

4 United (Daniel Küblböck, Gracia Baur, Nektarios Bamiatzis, Stephanie Brauckmeyer)
 Singles: "Don't Close Your Eyes"

Elimination chart

Because of Judith's withdrawal, Nicole, who just missed out to get into the top 10, replaced her.

References 

Season 01
2002 German television series debuts
2002 in German music
2002 German television seasons